Richard Alexander Ankiel (born July 19, 1979) is an American former professional baseball outfielder and pitcher who played in Major League Baseball (MLB) for the St. Louis Cardinals, Kansas City Royals, Atlanta Braves, Washington Nationals, Houston Astros, and New York Mets.

Ankiel was a pitcher with the Cardinals from 1999 until 2001, when he found himself unable to throw strikes consistently. After trying to regain his pitching form in the minor leagues and briefly returning to the majors in 2004, he switched to the outfield in early 2005. For two and a half years, he honed his skills as a hitter and fielder in the Cardinals' minor-league system. He returned to the Cardinals on August 9, 2007. As a Cardinal until 2009, Ankiel hit 47 home runs as an outfielder and two as a pitcher. After the 2009 season, Ankiel became a free agent. Subsequently, he was signed by the Royals and later was traded to the Braves.

Ankiel became the first player after Babe Ruth to win at least 10 games as a pitcher and also hit at least 70 home runs. Ankiel is also the only player other than Ruth to both start a postseason game as a pitcher and hit a home run in the postseason as a position player. His change of position, and the fact that he played for six teams in a five-season span, suggest that Ankiel's playing history represents "one of the stranger careers in baseball history" in the words of journalist Barry Petchesky.

Early career
Ankiel attended Port St. Lucie High School in Florida, where he went 11–1 with a 0.47 earned run average (ERA) during his senior season, striking out 162 batters in 74 innings pitched, and was named the High School Player of the Year by USA Today in 1997.

The St. Louis Cardinals selected Ankiel in the second round of the 1997 Major League Baseball Draft. He received a $2.5 million signing bonus. In 1998, he was voted the best pitching prospect in both the Carolina and Midwest League, and was the Carolina League's All-Star starting pitcher, Baseball Americas first-team Minor League All-Star starting pitcher, and the Cardinals' Minor League Player of the Year. That year, he led all minor league pitchers in strikeouts with 222.

In 1999, Ankiel was named the Minor League Player of the Year by both Baseball America and USA Today. He was also Texas League All-Star pitcher, Double-A All-Star starting pitcher, Cardinals Minor League Player of the Year, and Baseball America First Team Minor League All-Star starting pitcher.

Major league career

1999 and 2000 seasons
Ankiel debuted in 1999 in Montreal, against the Expos. He pitched his first full season in 2000 at the age of 20 (second youngest player in the league), posting an 11–7 record, a 3.50 ERA (tenth in the league), and 194 strikeouts (seventh in the league) in 30 games started. Ankiel threw a 94- to 97-mph fastball, a heavy sinker, and a fall-off-the-table curveball that was his main strikeout pitch. He struck out batters at a rate of 9.98 strikeouts per nine innings (second in the National League only to Randy Johnson), and allowed only 7.05 hits per nine innings (second only to Chan Ho Park). He came in second (to the Atlanta Braves' Rafael Furcal) in the NL Rookie of the Year voting. He received The Sporting News Rookie Pitcher of the Year Award.

2000 postseason
The Cardinals won the National League Central Division championship in 2000. Injuries to other pitchers left Ankiel and Darryl Kile as the only fully healthy starters left on the roster. Cardinals manager Tony La Russa chose Ankiel to start Game One of the National League Division Series against veteran pitcher Greg Maddux of the Braves. To shield Ankiel from media pressure, La Russa had Kile answer questions to the media as if to start Game One, and afterwards informed the media that Ankiel was starting.

In Game One, Ankiel did not allow a run through the first two innings. His performance suddenly deteriorated in the third. He allowed four runs on two hits, four walks and throwing five wild pitches before being removed with two outs. Despite Ankiel facing eight batters and throwing 35 pitches, the Cardinals won the game. Ankiel shrugged off the event, joking that he was the first pitcher to throw five wild pitches in an inning since Bert Cunningham of the Players' League in 1890.

In his next start, Game Two of the National League Championship Series against the New York Mets, Ankiel was removed in the first inning after throwing 20 pitches, five of which went past catcher Eli Marrero (only two were official wild pitches, as no runners were on base for the others), and the first of which sailed over the head of Mets' hitter Timo Perez. Ankiel appeared again in the seventh inning of Game Five facing four hitters, walking two and throwing two more wild pitches. The Cardinals lost the series four games to one to the Mets.

The source of Ankiel's problems were unknown, and his loss of control, often called "the yips" in sports, has been compared to that of Steve Blass, who also became unable to consistently throw strikes for unknown reasons. A section of a book about Cardinals manager Tony LaRussa, Three Nights in August, details Ankiel's rise to the big leagues and loss of control as a pitcher in 2000–2001. LaRussa has stated that putting Ankiel into Game One of the 2000 NLDS was "a decision that perhaps haunts him more than any he has ever made."

Control issues (2001-2005)

Ankiel returned to the majors in 2001 but again had issues controlling his pitches, walking 25 batters and throwing five wild pitches in 24 innings, and was sent down to Triple-A. His problems in the minors became dramatic. In  innings, Ankiel walked 17 batters and threw 12 wild pitches, accumulating a 20.77 ERA. He was demoted all the way down to the Rookie League Johnson City Cardinals, where he was successful as both a starting pitcher and a part-time designated hitter (sporting a .638 slugging percentage with 10 home runs and 35 RBIs in 105 at-bats). He was voted Rookie Level Player of the Year, Appalachian League All-Star left-handed pitcher, Rookie League All-Star starting pitcher, Appalachian League Pitcher of the Year, and Appalachian League All-Star designated hitter.

In 2002, Ankiel sat out the season due to a left elbow sprain, and was not cleared to throw until December. He returned to the minors in 2003, posting a 6.29 ERA in 10 starts before undergoing season-ending ulnar collateral ligament reconstruction (Tommy John surgery) for his left elbow in July. In  innings, he walked 49 batters and threw 10 wild pitches.

Ankiel returned to the majors in September 2004, posting a 5.40 ERA in five relief appearances. Ankiel's control problems appeared to be gone, as he walked just one while striking out nine in ten innings. In the minors, he walked only two batters in  innings, while striking out 23. However, on March 9, 2005, after a successful winter pitching in the Puerto Rican Professional Baseball League, Ankiel announced that he was switching to the outfield, after a spring training game in which he threw only three strikes out of 20 pitches. He slugged .514 in Single-A, and .515 in Double-A, with 5 outfield assists in 55 games.

2006 season
In 2006, Ankiel was invited to spring training by the Cardinals as an outfielder, with a slim chance to make the team as a reserve player. His fielding impressed scouts and managers, and he had shown flashes of power hitting in the minor leagues. However, he injured his left knee before the season started, and had season-ending surgery on May 26.

2007 season
Ankiel was invited to the Cardinals' 2007 spring training and began that season at Triple-A Memphis Redbirds. On May 28, 2007, he hit two home runs in a game against the Round Rock Express. He also hit an RBI double and made an over-the-shoulder catch in deep center field that saved two runs.

Ankiel was named a starting outfielder for the 2007 Triple-A All-Star Game. Through August 8, he had 32 home runs, 89 RBIs, and was hitting .267, including a three-home run performance on June 16 against the Iowa Cubs. He was the home run leader in the Pacific Coast League, and tied for second in RBIs. Defensively, Ankiel had seven errors in 95 games.

Return to the majors
On August 9, 2007, the Cardinals promoted Ankiel from Memphis after a roster spot was vacated by Scott Spiezio's departure. In his first game, Ankiel batted second and played right field. In his first at bat, he received a prolonged standing ovation from the St. Louis crowd. During the seventh inning, he hit a three-run home run off Doug Brocail to right field to help the Cardinals defeat the San Diego Padres, 5–0. It was his first home run in the majors since April 2000 (as a pitcher), and made him the first player since Clint Hartung (1947) to hit his first major league home run as a pitcher and then hit a home run as a position player. The player before Hartung who accomplished this was Babe Ruth. After the game, Tony La Russa said that his only happier moment as a Cardinal was when they won the 2006 World Series. Two days later, against the Dodgers on August 11, Ankiel drew three standing ovations. He had three hits, including two home runs and three RBIs and made a spectacular catch in right field.

Ankiel's comeback prompted syndicated columnist Charles Krauthammer to write on August 17, 2007:

Ankiel hit his first grand slam in St. Louis against left-hander Eddie Guardado of the Cincinnati Reds on August 31 with the team trailing, 4–3, for an 8–5 win that broke a tie with Red Schoendienst for La Russa for most wins by a Cardinals manager. In a home game against the Pittsburgh Pirates on September 6, he recorded his second two–home run game of the season with a 3-for-4, 7-RBI effort, along with an over-the-shoulder catch in deep right field. On September 23, Ankiel had his first walk-off hit, a two-run triple to win the last Sunday Night Baseball game of the season – against the Astros, 4–3.

Ankiel finished the year with a .285 batting average, 11 home runs, 39 RBIs, a .328 on-base percentage, .535 slugging percentage, and an .863 OPS in 47 games and 172 at-bats. The Cardinals, who had won division titles from 2004 to 2006 and the 2006 World Series, finished 2007 with a 78–84 record and missed the playoffs.

Following the season, Ankiel admitted to using human growth hormone (HGH), but said he was following doctor's orders. HGH was not banned by Major League Baseball until 2005. Major League Baseball concluded that there was insufficient evidence of any wrongdoing by Ankiel.

2008 season
Ankiel helped the Cardinals defeat the Colorado Rockies on May 6 by recording two outfield assists and a home run to propel St. Louis to a 6–5 victory. Ankiel, on both assists, threw the ball from deep center field to Troy Glaus at third on the fly. He finished 2008 with a .264 batting average, 25 home runs, and 71 runs batted in.

2009 season
Ankiel was the Cardinals' leading hitter in spring training but struggled at the plate when the season started. During a May 4 game against the Philadelphia Phillies, Ankiel collided with the outfield wall and was carried off the field. The injury was reported as whiplash, and Ankiel was placed on the disabled list on May 7. He was re-activated on May 24. Ankiel platooned with Colby Rasmus for much of the remainder of the year and finished the season with 11 home runs, 38 RBI, and a .231 batting average.

2010 season
In January 2010, Ankiel signed a one-year, $3.25 million contract with the Kansas City Royals. He began the season as the Royals' starting center fielder, but was placed on the disabled list in early May with a strained right quadriceps after playing sparingly from April 24 on. He was activated on July 23, and replaced an injured David DeJesus midway through the game in center field. On July 31, Ankiel and reliever Kyle Farnsworth were traded to the Atlanta Braves for Jesse Chavez, Gregor Blanco and Tim Collins.

On October 8, in the second game of the 2010 NLDS against the San Francisco Giants, Ankiel hit his first career postseason home run into McCovey Cove off Giants reliever Ramón Ramírez in the top of the 11th inning, leading the Braves to a 5–4 win. Rick joined Barry Bonds as the only two players to hit a ball into the cove in the postseason. Speaking on television after the game, Ankiel called the home run "the pinnacle of anything I've ever done." He finished the 2010 season with a .232 batting average, 6 home runs, and 24 RBI in only 74 games.

2011 season

On November 2, 2010, the Braves declined Ankiel's club option, making him a free agent. On December 20, 2010, the Washington Nationals signed him to a one-year, $1.5 million contract.

Ankiel played in 122 games for the Nationals in 2011, hitting .239 with 9 home runs and 37 RBIs while platooning in center field with Roger Bernadina. He had a .996 fielding percentage for the season, committing one error in 113 games in the outfield.

2012 season
The Nationals re-signed Ankiel to a one-year, $1.25 million minor league deal for 2012. He began the season on the disabled list, rehabbing in the minors. Once promoted, his role was limited as a backup outfielder. In 68 games, he hit .228 with five home runs and 15 RBIs in 158 at-bats. He started 37 games in center field and played 62 total games in center with a .983 fielding percentage. On July 19, Nationals closer Drew Storen was added to the roster, and Ankiel was designated for assignment by the Nationals to make room. On July 27, Ankiel was released by the Nationals.

2013 season

On January 17, 2013, the Houston Astros signed Ankiel with an invite to spring training as a non-roster invitee. On March 31, Ankiel homered in the Astros' regular season opener against the Texas Rangers in Houston. He was designated for assignment on May 6 and released shortly thereafter.

One week later on May 13, the New York Mets signed Ankiel and immediately placed him into their starting lineup. He collected two hits, including a two-run homer, against the Cardinals in St. Louis on May 15.

His offensive production regressed, and following an 0-for-4, three-strikeout performance against the Miami Marlins on June 8 (giving him a combined 60 strikeouts in 128 at-bats for the season), Ankiel was designated for assignment by the Mets. He became a free agent on June 13. In 45 games, he batted .188 with 7 home runs and 18 RBI and a .422 slugging percentage.

Retirement
Ankiel announced his retirement from Major League Baseball on March 5, 2014.

On January 8, 2015, the Washington Nationals announced that they had hired Ankiel as a "Life Skills Coordinator." In this role, Ankiel mentors players both at the major league level as well as in the Nationals' farm system.

In April 2017, Ankiel's memoir, The Phenomenon: Pressure, The Yips, and the Pitch that Changed My Life, was published.

In August 2018, Ankiel stated that he was "toying with" the idea of possibly pitching in professional baseball again. Later that month, Ankiel announced that he was planning a return to Major League Baseball for the 2019 season as a pitcher. In October, he underwent "primary repair" surgery, an alternative to Tommy John surgery, in his pitching elbow. Ankiel officially ended his comeback attempt on July 30, 2019. He was eligible to be elected into the Hall of Fame in 2019, but received less than 5% of the vote and became ineligible for the 2020 ballot.

After retiring, Ankiel became a commentator and studio analyst for Bally Sports Midwest, frequently joining Dan McLaughlin in calling Cardinals games.

Personal life
Ankiel lives in Jupiter, Florida with wife, Lory. They have two sons. He periodically joins Cardinals television broadcasts.

In popular culture 
The 2016 film, The Phenom, starring Ethan Hawke, Johnny Simmons, and Paul Giamatti, is loosely based on Ankiel's personal life and professional struggles.

See also

 List of Major League Baseball players named in the Mitchell Report
 Two-way player

Notes

External links

 Ankiel's Official Website
 Baseball Prospectus stats
 Rick Ankiel's page at stlcardinals.scout.com

1979 births
Living people
People from Fort Pierce, Florida
Major League Baseball pitchers
Major League Baseball center fielders
St. Louis Cardinals players
Kansas City Royals players
Atlanta Braves players
Washington Nationals players
Houston Astros players
New York Mets players
Palm Beach Cardinals players
Memphis Redbirds players
Springfield Cardinals players
Tennessee Smokies players
Arkansas Travelers players
Peoria Chiefs players
Johnson City Cardinals players
Prince William Cannons players
Swing of the Quad Cities players
Syracuse Chiefs players
Omaha Royals players
Harrisburg Senators players
Gulf Coast Nationals players
Hagerstown Suns players
Baseball players from Florida